Luca Ravanelli (born 6 January 1997) is an Italian professional footballer who plays as a defender for  club Frosinone, on loan from Cremonese.

Club career

Sassuolo
Born in Trento, Ravanelli was a youth exponent of Sassuolo.

Loan to Padova

On 14 July 2017, Ravanelli was loaned to Serie C side Padova on a season-long loan deal. On 30 July he made his debut for Padova in a 2–1 home win, after extra-time, over Rende in the first round of Coppa Italia, he played the entire match. On 8 October he made his Serie C debut as a substitute replacing Alessandro Capello in the 81st minute of a 3–1 home win over Südtirol. On 25 November, Ravanelli played his first entire match for Padova, a 2–1 away win over AlbinoLeffe. On 12 March 2018 he scored his first professional goal in the 49th minute of a 2–1 away win over Bassano Virtus. On 12 May he scored his second goal in the 79th minute of a 5–1 home win over Livorno in the Supercoppa di Serie C. Ravanelli ended his loan to Padova with the Serie C title, 20 appearances and 2 goals.

On 7 July 2018 he returned to Padova with another season-long loan. On 5 August he started his season at Padova with a 1–0 home win over Monza in the second round of Coppa Italia, he played the entire match. Three weeks later, on 26 August, he made his Serie B debut and he scored his first goal of the season in the 36th minute of a 1–1 away draw against Hellas Verona. One more week later, on 1 September, he scored his second goal in the 40th minute of a 1–0 home win over Venezia. Ravanelli ended his second season on loan to Padova with 18 appearances, including 16 of them as a starter, and 2 goals.

Loan to Cremonese
On 9 July 2019, Ravanelli joined to Serie B side Cremonese on loan with an option to buy. On 11 August he made his debut for the team in a 4–0 home win over Virtus Francavilla in the second round of Coppa Italia, he played the entire match. Two weeks later, on 24 August, he made his Serie B debut for Cremonese in a 2–1 away win over Venezia, he played the entire match. On 3 March 2020, Ravnelli scored his first goal in Serie B in the 27th minute of a 3–2 home defeat against Empoli. Ravanelli ended his season-long loan to Cremonese with 32 appearances, including 30 of them as a tarter and scoring one goal.

On 1 September 2020, he returned on loan to Cremonese until 30 June 2021. On 4 October, Ravanelli made his seasonal debut for the club as a starter in a 1–1 away draw against Pisa, he played the entire match.

Cremonese
On 7 July 2021, he moved to Cremonese on a permanent basis. On 26 August 2022, Ravanelli joined Frosinone on loan.

Career statistics

Club

Honours

Club
Padova
 Serie C: 2017–18
Supercoppa di Serie C: 2018

Personal life
It has been mistakenly reported in some sources that Luca is a son of Fabrizio Ravanelli. According to Luca he is his Brother.

References

External links
 

1997 births
Sportspeople from Trento
Living people
Association football defenders
Italian footballers
Parma Calcio 1913 players
U.S. Sassuolo Calcio players
Calcio Padova players
U.S. Cremonese players
Frosinone Calcio players
Serie C players
Serie B players
Footballers from Trentino-Alto Adige/Südtirol